Richard Davis (born April 15, 1930) is an American jazz bassist. Among his best-known contributions to the albums of others are Eric Dolphy's Out to Lunch!, Andrew Hill's Point of Departure, and Van Morrison's Astral Weeks, of which critic Greil Marcus wrote (in The Rolling Stone Illustrated History of Rock and Roll), "Richard Davis provided the greatest bass ever heard on a rock album."

Music career
Born in Chicago, Illinois, United States, Davis began his musical career with his brothers, singing bass in his family's vocal trio. He studied double bass in high school with his music theory teacher and band director, Walter Dyett. He was a member of Chicago Youth Symphony Orchestras (then known as the Youth Orchestra of Greater Chicago) and played in the orchestra's first performance at Chicago's Orchestra Hall on November 14, 1947. After high school, he studied double bass with Rudolf Fahsbender of the Chicago Symphony Orchestra while attending VanderCook College of Music.

After college, Davis performed in dance bands. The connections he made led him to pianist Don Shirley. In 1954, he and Shirley moved to New York City and performed together until 1956, when Davis began playing with the Sauter-Finegan Orchestra. In 1957, he became part of Sarah Vaughan's rhythm section, touring and recording with her until 1960.

During the 1960s, Davis was in demand in a variety of musical circles. He worked with many of the small jazz groups of the time, including those led by Eric Dolphy, Jaki Byard, Booker Ervin, Andrew Hill, Elvin Jones, and Cal Tjader. From 1966 to 1972, he was a member of The Thad Jones/Mel Lewis Orchestra. He has also played with Don Sebesky, Oliver Nelson, Frank Sinatra, Miles Davis, Dexter Gordon, Joe Henderson and Ahmad Jamal.

Davis recorded with pop and rock musicians in the 1970s, appearing on Laura Nyro's Smile, Van Morrison's Astral Weeks (for which Davis also served as de facto bandleader during the recording sessions), and Bruce Springsteen's Greetings From Asbury Park, N.J. and Born to Run. During his career he performed classical music with conductors Igor Stravinsky, Leonard Bernstein, Pierre Boulez, Leopold Stokowski, and Gunther Schuller.

After living in New York City for 23 years, he moved to Wisconsin in 1977 and became a professor at the University of Wisconsin–Madison, teaching bass, jazz history, and improvisation. His former students include William Parker, David Ephross, Sandor Ostlund, Hans Sturm, Alex Kalfayan, Ryan Maxwell and Karl E. H. Seigfried.

Awards and honors
 Best Bassist, Downbeat International Critics' Poll (1967–74)
 NEA Jazz Master (2014)

Discography

 Heavy Sounds (Impulse!, 1967) with Elvin Jones
 Muses for Richard Davis (MPS, 1969)
 The Philosophy of the Spiritual (Cobblestone, 1971)
 Epistrophy & Now's the Time (Muse, 1972)
 Dealin' (Muse, 1973)
 As One (Muse, 1976)
 Fancy Free (Galaxy, 1977)
 Divine Gemini (SteepleChase, 1978) with Walt Dickerson
 Harvest (Muse, 1977 [1979])
 Way Out West (Muse, 1977 [1980])
 Tenderness (SteepleChase, 1977 [1985]) with Walt Dickerson
 Persia My Dear (DIW, 1987)
 Body and Soul (Enja, 1989 [1991]) with Archie Shepp
 The Bassist: Homage to Diversity (Palmetto, 2001)

References

External links
Official site

1930 births
Living people
Male double-bassists
Hard bop double-bassists
Jazz fusion double-bassists
Mainstream jazz double-bassists
Musicians from New York City
Musicians from Madison, Wisconsin
Post-bop double-bassists
University of Wisconsin–Madison faculty
Muse Records artists
Impulse! Records artists
Palmetto Records artists
Galaxy Records artists
Cobblestone Records artists
American jazz double-bassists
American classical double-bassists
Jazz musicians from New York (state)
Classical musicians from New York (state)
Classical musicians from Wisconsin
21st-century double-bassists
21st-century American male musicians
American male jazz musicians
Mingus Dynasty (band) members
The Thad Jones/Mel Lewis Orchestra members
Creative Construction Company members
Orchestra U.S.A. members